Project Runway Vietnam is a reality television program in Vietnam for training search and designer fashion by Multimedia company JSC, copyright holder and producer.

Seasons

Season 1
The preliminary program was held attwo2 areas of Hanoi and Ho Chi Minh City in mid-March 2013. Episode first aired at 20h on Sunday evening VTV3, starting from April 28, 2013.
Top 3 of Project Runway Vietnam 2013 were taken to Paris by Harper's Bazaar.

Designer

(Ages listed are the designers' ages at the time the show was taped in spring 2013.)

Models
The model winner received 100 million VND from Maybelline. 12 models:
 Hồng Nhung (eliminated - 12th)
 Phương Thảo (eliminated - 11th) prior Vietnam's Next Top Model (cycle 4)
 Minh Thi (eliminated - 9/10th) semi-finalist from Vietnam's Next Top Model (cycle 3)
 Thanh Thảo (eliminated - 9/10th) from Vietnam's Next Top Model (cycle 3)
 Kate (Eliminated - 8th)
 Linh Ngân (eliminated - 6/7th) semi-finalist from Vietnam's Next Top Model (cycle 3)
 Lê Phương (Eliminated - 6/7th) from Vietnam's Next Top Model (cycle 2)
 Ngọc Thúy (Eliminated - 4/5th) from Vietnam's Next Top Model (cycle 3)
 Đỗ Hà (Eliminated - 4/5th) from Vietnam's Next Top Model (cycle 3)
 Nhã Trúc (Eliminated - 3rd) from Vietnam's Next Top Model (cycle 3)
 Lam Giang (Eliminated - 2nd)
 Lệ Quyên (Winner) prior Hoa khôi áo dài 2014

Challenge

Results
 Green background and WINNER means the designer won Project Runway Vietnam.
 Blue background and WIN means the designer won that challenge.
 Turquoise background and HIGH means the designer came in second but did not win the challenge.
 Light blue background and HIGH means the designer had one of the highest scores for that challenge, but did not win.
 Pink background and LOW means the designer had one of the lowest scores for that challenge, but was not eliminated.
 Orange background and LOW means the designer was in the bottom two, but was not eliminated;
 Red background and OUT means the designer lost and was out of the competition.

: The models were not used in episode 6.
: Both designers and their models were eliminated at the end of episode.

 The model won Project Runway Vietnam.
 The model wore the winning design that challenge.
 The model wore the losing design that challenge.
 The model was eliminated.

Designer Legend
 Minh Hà: MH
 Chấn Hưng: CH
 Gia Khang: GK
 Bảo Loan: BL
 Như Lan: NL
 Tiến Mạnh: TM
 Hải Yến: HY
 Diễm My: DM
 Hoàng Minh: HM
 Bá Tùng: BT
 Trúc Phương: TP
 Tùng Lâm: TL

Season 2
Vietnam 2014 Project Runway is back with a whole new look. Preliminary program will be held at 2 areas of Hanoi and Ho Chi Minh City in mid-March 2014. Episode first aired at 20h on Sunday evening VTV3, starting from May 11, 2014.

The winner of this season of Project Runway Vietnam received an editorial feature in an issue of Harper's Bazaar magazine with 200,000,000 ₫, a scholarship from Atelier Chardon Savard, a cash prize of 300,000,000 ₫ from Canifa and joining with the design team of Canifa. a cash prize of 200,000,000 ₫ from Nokia Vietnam, a 450,000,000 ₫ 1 years Ceturyon member ship from California Fitness.

Top 3 of Project Runway Vietnam 2014 will be taking to Paris by Harper's Bazaar and the Top 5 will be taking to Seoul with Elise.

Designer

(ages listed are the designers' ages at the time the show was taped in the summer of 2014.)

Model
12 model will battle to catwalk on New York Couture Fashion Week are:
Kim Thoa (Eliminated - 12th) from Vietnam's Next Top Model (cycle 4)
Lý Mỹ Dinh (Eliminated - 11th)
Văn Kiên (Eliminated - 9/10th) from Vietnam's Next Top Model (cycle 4)
Phạm Công Toàn (Eliminated - 9/10th) prior Vietnam's Next Top Model (cycle 5)
Tùng Anh (Eliminated - 8th)
Nguyễn Quyên (Eliminated - 6/7th)
Quang Đại (Eliminated - 6/7th) from Vietnam's Next Top Model (cycle 4)
Cao Ngân (Eliminated - 4/5th) prior Vietnam's Next Top Model (cycle 5)
Nguyễn Thanh (Eliminated - 4/5th) from Vietnam's Next Top Model (cycle 4)
Thúy Hạnh (Eliminated - 3rd)
Anh Thư (Eliminated - 2nd) prior Hoa khôi Áo dài 2014
Quỳnh Châu (Winner) prior Vietnam's Next Top Model (cycle 5)

Challenge

: Initially, Tien won the second challenge while Linh and Quan came in second and third respectively. However, in the following episode, he was accused of cheating by his fellow competitors because they believed he used his own money purchase extra materials, which wasn't allowed in this competition. Despite host Truong Ngoc Anh said his work was deserved to win, but due to his regulatory violation, she stripped off his triumph and passed the challenged award to Linh.
: Phong originally was appreciated by judge with the best creative design but he was accused of copying Balenciaga design in a Harper's Bazaar magazine and was in bottom two with Vu.
: At first Thuy Nga was originally eliminated with fellow competitors Nguyen Phong and Dieu Linh. However due to guest judge, Luu Nga's kindness, Thuy Nga was given an opportunity to travel with the group to Korea. This led to tension between the other judges but, they reluctantly allowed Thuy Nga to continue the competition and therefore saving Thuy Nga from elimination.
Results
 Green background and WINNER means the designer won Project Runway Vietnam.
 Blue background and WIN means the designer won that challenge.
 Turquoise background and HIGH means the designer came in second but did not win the challenge.
 Light blue background and HIGH means the designer had one of the highest scores for that challenge, but did not win.
 Pink background and LOW means the designer had one of the lowest scores for that challenge, but was not eliminated.
 Orange background and LOW means the designer was in the bottom two, but was not eliminated;
 Red background and OUT means the designer lost and was out of the competition.

: Due to Tien's regulatory violation, Linh inherited the award. Thus, Nguyen Thanh is a model who wore the winning design challenge.
: After revealed Top 3 designers, they had to choose one model, who became their vedette in the final show.

 The model won Project Runway Vietnam.
 The model wore the winning design that challenge.
 The model wore the losing design that challenge.
 The model was eliminated.

Designer Legend
Giám Tiền: GT
Hồng Lam: HL
Minh Quân: MQ
Minh Công: MC
Thùy Nga: TN
Diệu Linh: DL
Nguyên Phong: NP
Tuấn Vũ: TV
Đình Chiến: ĐC
Nguyễn Thảo: NT
Đặng Khánh: ĐK
Lan Anh: LA

Season 3
Third season was hashtag: #passionwins (mean #songvoidamme)

Designer

Tiền Truyển celebrated his 22nd birthday in the filming week of episode 2.
(ages listed are the designers' ages at the time the show was taped in the spring of 20

Challenge

In episode 4, Giang Tú would be eliminated, but Tùng Leo want to be stay for Giang Tú for another week. Next week, Giang Tú would be penalty 5-hours (25 hours remain), and the rest will be fully 30 hours.
Results
 Green background and WINNER means the designer won Project Runway Vietnam.
 Blue background and WIN means the designer won that challenge.
 Turquoise background and HIGH means the designer came in second but did not win the challenge.
 Light blue background and HIGH means the designer had one of the highest scores for that challenge, but did not win.
 Pink background and LOW means the designer had one of the lowest scores for that challenge, but was not eliminated.
 Orange background and LOW means the designer was in the bottom two, but was not eliminated;
 Red background and OUT means the designer lost and was out of the competitionơ

 The model won Project Runway Vietnam.
 The model wore the winning design that challenge.
 The model wore the losing design that challenge.
 The model was eliminated.

Designer Legend
Châu Kha: CK
Giang Tú: GT
Quốc An: QA
Ngọc Bích: NB
Tuyến Truyển: TT
Hải Yến: HY
Tuấn Phương: TP
Văn Thảo: VT
Hà Thông: HT
Anh Dũng: AD
Trần Hùng: TH
Anh Minh: AM

References
List of television programmes broadcast by Vietnam Television (VTV)

Vietnamese reality television series
Vietnam
2013 Vietnamese television series debuts
Vietnamese television series based on American television series
Vietnamese fashion designers